Many families in the United States have produced multiple generations of politicians who have had a significant influence on government and public policy in their communities, states and in the country. Some have been involved because of personal ambition, some to continue their family’s work, and some out of a sense of duty. Rose Fitzgerald Kennedy, whose family had achieved considerable wealth and influence within two generations of emigrating from Ireland, was fond of the verse from the gospel of Luke in the New Testament, “To whom much is given, much is required,” and her descendants often cited that as an influence. 

Many of these families moved to national prominence from a state or region, for example, the Huntington family of Connecticut, the Long family of Louisiana, the Harrisons and Lees of Virginia, the Roosevelts of New York, the Daleys, and the Stevensons of Illinois, the Muhlenbergs of Pennsylvania, the Tafts of Ohio, the Frelinghuysens of New Jersey, the Lodges of Massachusetts and DuPont family of Delaware.

Other families are or have been politically involved in multiple states. The Bush family includes a U.S. senator from Connecticut, a member of Congress and a governor from Texas (both of whom became president), and a governor of Florida. Members of the Rockefeller family have been elected to public office in New York, West Virginia and Arkansas. 

Kennedy family members have been elected to public office in Massachusetts, New York, Rhode Island, Connecticut, Maryland, and California. The Udall family first became prominent in Arizona, but three cousins from the most recent generation simultaneously served in the U.S. Senate from Colorado, New Mexico, and Oregon. 

Bill Clinton served as governor of Arkansas before being elected the 42nd U.S. president; his wife, Hillary Clinton, was elected to the U.S. Senate from New York before serving as U.S. secretary of State.

Alphabetical list

See also
List of political families

References

External links
A database of political history and cemeteries